Katonaia hemileopsis is a species of tephritid or fruit flies in the genus Katonaia of the family Tephritidae.

Distribution
Greece.

References

Tephritinae
Insects described in 1947
Diptera of Europe